The Adran Premier, currently known as genero Adran Premier (for sponsorship reasons), is the highest level of league competition for women's football in Wales. It is the women's equivalent of the men's Cymru Premier, and it is organized by the Football Association of Wales. The competition began on 4 September 2022.

Teams

League table

Results

Matches 1–18

References

Women's football in Wales